When We Fall may refer to:

 When We Fall (Rebecca Frazier album), 2013
 When We Fall (All Our Exes Live in Texas album), 2017

See also
 When We All Fall Asleep, Where Do We Go?, a 2019 studio album by Billie Eilish